John Murray (born July 4, 1987) is an American-Polish professional ice hockey goaltender currently playing for GKS Tychy in the Polska Hokej Liga. In 2014, he won the PHL playoff championship with Ciarko PBS Bank KH Sanok and again in 2018 and 2019 with GKS Tychy. He also plays for the Poland men's national ice hockey team.

Playing career

Junior
Murray played minor hockey with the Philadelphia Jr. Flyers until the age of 16. At 16 years of age, Murray left home for Youngstown, Ohio, to play for the North American Hockey League's Youngstown Phantoms. He played in 21 games that season. For the next two seasons, Murray played for the United States Hockey League's Sioux Falls Stampede, where his teammates included T.J. Oshie, Andreas Nodl, Jay Barriball and Alex Kangas. In his first season with Sioux Falls, Murray had a dismal record of 7-13-2 and a goals-against average of 3.24 but he still managed to have a save percentage of .902%, thanks mostly to one shutout. The next season, Murray had a GAA of 2.14 while allowing only 68 goals, the same as he did the year before, as well as a much-improved record of 23-7-1 and three shutouts. He also had a save percentage of .930%, both of which were second-best in the USHL that season. Murray and teammate Alex Kangas found themselves both ranked in the Final Central Scouting for the 2006 NHL Entry Draft for North American goaltenders with Kangas ranked tenth and Murray ranked 22nd. (Both had slipped through the draft the year before.) Kangas was chosen 135th overall by the Atlanta Thrashers but Murray was not drafted.

Murray then began to contemplate his future. He considered playing for the University of Maine but he did not have a scholarship. His agent then contacted him with a job offer with the OHL's Kitchener Rangers. The Rangers had lost their #1 goaltender, Dan Turple, to graduation after being signed by Atlanta. On May 25, 2006, considering the length of the OHL schedule, Murray signed with the Rangers, eventually taking the #1 job away from sophomore goaltender Mark Packwood. After Packwood was traded to the Oshawa Generals, rookie Charles Lavigne (now with the Québec Remparts) backed up Murray for the rest of the 2006-07 OHL season. Murray finished the 2006-07 season with a record of 40-9-3, a 2.58 GAA, a .909% save percentage and five shutouts. He represented the Western Conference at the 2007 OHL All-Star Classic in Saginaw, Michigan.

During the 2007 offseason, Murray was signed to a professional tryout contract by the Columbus Blue Jackets. During a game against the rookies of the Dallas Stars, former OHL foe James Neal cross-checked Murray in the shoulder after making a save. The cross-check separated Murray's shoulder and it broke his collarbone in two places. Thinking that he would have had a spot on the Syracuse Crunch, Murray was sent back to Kitchener as an overage player. The Rangers, however, had two new rookie goaltenders, Josh Unice and Mavric Parks, as well as three overagers already on their roster. On December 7, 2007, the Rangers traded Murray to the Kingston Frontenacs, who desperately needed a goalie after Anthony Peters was hit by a car and broke his leg in an accident in Windsor. The next night, Murray was in goal for his first game of the 2007-08 season, starting against his former team. He allowed six goals on 50 shots against. On January 25, 2008, Murray was involved in a fight with Niagara IceDogs goaltender Lucas Lobsinger which resulted in a two-game suspension. Murray finished the season with a 12-15-1 record, a 3.78 goals-against average and a .901% save percentage. During his two OHL seasons, Murray also accumulated 37 penalty minutes.

Professional
After the Kingston Frontenacs missed the playoffs in 2008, Murray was signed by the ECHL's Reading Royals. In his first ECHL start, against the Elmira Jackals at First Arena in Elmira, New York, he recorded a 38-save shutout en route to being named the first star of the game. In the summer of 2008, Murray was signed to the ECHL's newest franchise, the Ontario Reign. Murray did well in Ontario, earning a berth at the 2009 ECHL All-Star Game in Reading. After Jeff Zatkoff came back from an injury, however, Murray found himself traded to the now-defunct Mississippi Sea Wolves in February 2009. He played in only two games for Mississippi, both of them losses. During the period of time between the ECHL All-Star Game and his trade, Murray was recalled by the Syracuse Crunch while Dan LaCosta was recalled by the Columbus Blue Jackets.

In the summer of 2009, Murray was signed to a two-way contract between the Manitoba Moose of the AHL and the Victoria Salmon Kings of the ECHL. After starting the 2009/10 season with the Salmon Kings, his job was taken away when the Calgary Flames assigned both David Shantz and Matt Keetley to the team. Murray was claimed by the Johnstown Chiefs, an ECHL team in his home state of Pennsylvania. With the Chiefs having folded, Murray was to return to the Salmon Kings in 2010/11; instead, he opted to sign with HK Partizan as a free agent. As a Partizan Murray had an outstanding season.  He posted a 1.97 GAA (goals against average) and a 0.933 save percentage in the regular season and led his team to victory over the HK Olimpija to become the 2010-2011 Slohokej League Champions and later Serbian Hockey League Champions.  In the Serbian Hockey League Championships against the KHK Crvena Zvezda Murray in two games posted a 0.951 save percentage and a 1.5 GAA.

References

External links

1987 births
Living people
American men's ice hockey goaltenders
Johnstown Chiefs players
Ice hockey players from Pennsylvania
Kingston Frontenacs players
Kitchener Rangers players
Kulager Petropavl players
Mississippi Sea Wolves players
Ontario Reign (ECHL) players
Orlik Opole players
HK Partizan players
Polish ice hockey goaltenders
Naturalized citizens of Poland
Quad City Mallards (CHL) players
Reading Royals players
Rio Grande Valley Killer Bees players
KH Sanok players
Sioux Falls Stampede players
Sportspeople from Lancaster, Pennsylvania
Syracuse Crunch players
GKS Tychy (ice hockey) players
Victoria Salmon Kings players
Youngstown Phantoms players
American expatriate ice hockey players in Canada
American expatriate ice hockey players in Serbia
American expatriate ice hockey players in Kazakhstan
American expatriate ice hockey players in Poland